Rain tree is a common name for several plants and may refer to:

Albizia saman, a tree in the family Fabaceae, native to a range extending from Mexico south to Peru and Brazil
Brunfelsia a genus of shrubs and small trees in the family Solanaceae, native to the tropical Americas
Philenoptera violacea, a tree in the family Fabaceae, native to southern Africa
 Golden rain tree, Koelreuteria paniculata, native to eastern Asia, in China and Korea
 Raintree, a British subsidiary of Capstone Publishers
 Raintree Pictures, a Singapore media and entertainment company.

See also
Rain Tree (film), a 2001 Iranian film